Edward Ralph Johnson was an Anglican priest  in the second half of the 19th century. He was born in 1828, educated at Wadham College, Oxford and ordained in 1850. His first post was a curacy in Farnborough, Warwickshire after which he was a Minor Canon at Chester Cathedral. He was Rector of Northenden and then collated Archdeacon of Chester in 1871 before being elevated to the episcopate as Bishop of Calcutta in 1876 and Metropolitan of India. He retired in 1898 and died on 11 September 1912.

References

External links

1828 births
1911 deaths
Alumni of Wadham College, Oxford
Archdeacons of Chester
Anglican bishops of Calcutta